Marys River Peak is the highest mountain in the Marys River Range of northern Elko County, Nevada, United States. It is located within the Jarbidge Wilderness, which is administered by the Jarbidge Ranger District of the Humboldt-Toiyabe National Forest. The peak's name is derived from the Marys River, a tributary of the Humboldt.

Summit panorama

References

External links

Mountains of Elko County, Nevada
Mountains of Nevada
Humboldt–Toiyabe National Forest